The 1934 Railway Cup Hurling Championship was the seventh staging of the Railway Cup since its establishment by the Gaelic Athletic Association in 1927. The cup began on 25 February 1934 and ended on 17 March 1934.

Leinster were the defending champions.

On 17 March 1976, Munster won the cup following a 4-03 to 3-02 defeat of Leinster in the final at Croke Park. This was their fifth Railway Cup title overall and their first title since 1931.

Results

Semi-final

Final

Top scorers

Top scorers overall

Bibliography

 Donegan, Des, The Complete Handbook of Gaelic Games (DBA Publications Limited, 2005).

References

Railway Cup Hurling Championship
Railway Cup Hurling Championship